Habrophora is a genus of leaf beetles in the subfamily Eumolpinae. It is distributed in Central America, South America, and the West Indies. It is placed in the tribe Habrophorini with the related genus Psathyrocerus.

Species

 Habrophora altimontana Bechyné, 1951
 Habrophora amazona Weise, 1921
 Habrophora annulicornis (Pic, 1923)
 Habrophora colorata Bechyné & Bechyné, 1961
 Habrophora costulata Lefèvre, 1885
 Habrophora elongata Bechyné, 1951
 Habrophora fenestrata Bechyné, 1951
 Habrophora fuscoornata (Clark, 1866)
 Habrophora gemella Monrós, 1952
 Habrophora gounellei (Pic, 1923)
 Habrophora lateralis Erichson, 1847
 Habrophora lineigera Bechyné, 1958
 Habrophora lineolata (Pic, 1923)
 Habrophora maculipennis Jacoby, 1882
 Habrophora maculosa (Pic, 1923)
 Habrophora montana Jacoby, 1893
 Habrophora mutila Monrós, 1952
 Habrophora notaticeps (Pic, 1923)
 Habrophora ornata Monrós, 1952
 Habrophora picturata Monrós, 1952
 Habrophora robusta (Pic, 1923)
 Habrophora simplex Monrós, 1952
 Habrophora thelmae Blake, 1968
 Habrophora tibialis Lefèvre, 1878
 Habrophora varia Erichson, 1847
 Habrophora viridicollis Jacoby, 1891
 Habrophora wittmeri Bechyné, 1953

References

Eumolpinae
Chrysomelidae genera
Beetles of North America
Beetles of South America
Taxa named by Wilhelm Ferdinand Erichson